Infinite Requiem is an original novel written by Daniel Blythe and based on the long-running British science fiction television series Doctor Who. It features the Seventh Doctor and Bernice. A prelude to the novel, also penned by Blythe, appeared in Doctor Who Magazine #223.

External links
Infinite Requiem Prelude
The Cloister Library - Infinite Requiem

1995 British novels
1995 science fiction novels
Virgin New Adventures
Seventh Doctor novels
Fiction set in 1997
Fiction set in the 24th century